The Chelopech mine is one of the largest gold mines in Bulgaria. The mine is located at the western part of the country in Sofia Province. The mine has estimated reserves of 41 tons of gold and 4,182 tons of silver.

References 

Gold mines in Bulgaria